Romano Negri (born 30 September 1964) is a former professional Australian rules footballer who played for the Adelaide Football Club in the Australian Football League (AFL).

Negri played initially for North Hobart in Tasmania and won a Weller Arnold Medal in 1986 after performing well at intrastate level. The following year he moved to Woodville and won the South Australian National Football League (SANFL) club's 'Best and Fairest' award in 1988 and also made his debut in interstate football for South Australia that year including starting at full-forward in an exhibition game against Western Australia at the BC Place stadium, then the world's largest indoor stadium located in Vancouver, Canada.

He made just one more appearance, the opening round of the 1992 AFL season.

References

External links
 
 

1964 births
Adelaide Football Club players
Woodville Football Club players
North Hobart Football Club players
Living people
Australian rules footballers from Tasmania